The Year's Best Fantasy Stories: 4 is an anthology of fantasy stories, edited by American writer Lin Carter. It was first published in paperback by DAW Books in 1978.

Summary
The book collects eleven novelettes and short stories by various fantasy authors, originally published in the years 1977 and 1978 that were deemed by the editor the best from the period represented, together with an introductory survey of the year in fantasy, an essay on the year's best fantasy books, and introductory notes to the individual stories by the editor. The pieces include a pseudonymous work (the story by "Grail Undwin", actually by Carter) and "posthumous collaborations" (the story by Howard and Offutt and the story by Smith, which was completed by Carter).

Carter's survey of the year is notable for a blistering review of Terry Brooks's The Sword of Shannara, described as "the single most cold-blooded, complete rip-off of another book that I have ever read," the other book in question being J. R. R. Tolkien's The Lord of the Rings. Per Carter, "Brooks wasn't trying to imitate Tolkien's prose, just steal his story line and complete cast of characters, and did it with such clumsiness and so heavy-handedly, that he virtually rubbed your nose in it."

Contents
"The Year in Fantasy" (Lin Carter)
"The Tale of Hauk" (Poul Anderson)
"A Farmer on the Clyde" (Grail Undwin)
"Prince Alcouz and the Magician" (Clark Ashton Smith)
"Nekht Semerkeht" (Robert E. Howard and Andrew J. Offutt)
"The Pillars of Hell" (Lin Carter)
"Lok the Depressor" (Philip Coakley)
"'Hark! Was That the Squeal of an Angry Thoat?'" (Avram Davidson)
"The Cloak of Dreams" (Pat McIntosh)
"The Land of Sorrow" (Phyllis Eisenstein)
"Odds Against the Gods" (Tanith Lee)
"The Changer of Names" (Ramsey Campbell)
"The Year's Best Fantasy Books" (Lin Carter)

References

1978 anthologies
Fantasy anthologies
Lin Carter anthologies
DAW Books books